Point Vernon is a coastal suburb in the Fraser Coast Region, Queensland, Australia.

History 

Amenities 
The Point Vernon/Pialba branch of the Queensland Country Women's Association meets at the QCWA Rooms at 7 Torquay Road, Pialba.

References

External links 
 

Suburbs of Hervey Bay
Coastline of Queensland